Walter Frederick Gale (27 November 1865 – 1 June 1945) was an Australian banker. Gale was born in Paddington, Sydney, New South Wales. He had a strong interest in astronomy and built his first telescope in 1884.

He discovered a number of comets, including the lost periodic comet 34D/Gale.  He also discovered five southern double stars with the prefix GLE, and several dark sky objects, including the planetary nebula, IC 5148 in Grus. In 1892, he described oases and canals on Mars. He was awarded the Jackson-Gwilt Medal of the Royal Astronomical Society in 1935 for "discoveries of comets and his work for astronomy in New South Wales."

A crater on Mars, Gale Crater, was named in his honour. It was selected as the 2012 landing site for the Curiosity Rover.

References

External links
Gale on the Australian Dictionary of Biography

1865 births
1945 deaths
19th-century Australian astronomers
Amateur astronomers
20th-century Australian astronomers
People from Sydney
Discoverers of comets